A by-election was held for the New South Wales Legislative Assembly seat of Neutral Bay on Saturday 15 December 1945. It was triggered by the death of the Leader of the New South Wales Liberal Party and Leader of the Opposition, Reginald Weaver, who died a week after suffering a mild heart attack in the Legislative Assembly chamber.

The seat was subsequently won by barrister Ivan Black. Neutral Bay being a safe Liberal seat, the Labor Party chose not to field a candidate.

Dates

Background
The seat of Neutral Bay, a safe Liberal seat, was held since 1927 by Reginald Weaver, who served as a Minister of the Crown in the Bavin and Stevens Governments. Weaver was the Speaker of the New South Wales Legislative Assembly until 1941 and the Leader of the Opposition since February 1944. He was also the first parliamentary leader of the newly-formed New South Wales Liberal Party since April 1945. Weaver suffered a heart attack in the Legislative Assembly chamber on the evening of 7 November 1945, and died a week later on 12 November 1945 at Hornsby Hospital.

Only two candidates nominated for the by-election. They were: Ivan Black, a barrister and war veteran, for the Liberal Party and Kenneth McLeod Bolton, a merchant, standing as an independent. A. E. Newland, the candidate of the small Services and Consumers Party of Australia, who had previously expressed interest in contesting, did not nominate because his name was not on the state electoral roll.

Results
The Liberal Party retained the seat, with a minimal change in the margin. The Liberal candidate, Ivan Black, emerged with 56% of the vote against Independent Kenneth Bolton.

Reginald Weaver died.

See also
Electoral results for the district of Neutral Bay
List of New South Wales state by-elections

References

New South Wales state by-elections
1945 elections in Australia
1940s in New South Wales
December 1945 events in Australia